Aisha Bint Yousuf al-Mannai is a Qatari academic and politician. In 2017 she was one of four women appointed to the Consultative Assembly, becoming one of the country's first female parliamentarians.

Biography
Al-Mannai earned bachelor degrees in education and Sharia at Qatar University, before studying for an MA and PhD at Al-Azhar University in Egypt. She subsequently became a professor at the College of Sharia and Islamic Studies at Qatar University, later becoming the college's dean, the first woman to become dean of a College of Sharia. She later became manager of the Muhammad Bin Hamad Al-Thani Center for Muslim Contributions to Civilization at Hamad Bin Khalifa University. She also volunteered with the Qatar Red Crescent Society, becoming its deputy chair, and served as a member of the Arab Parliament.

In November 2017 al-Mannai was appointed to the Consultative Council by Emir Tamim bin Hamad Al Thani.

References

Living people
Qatar University alumni
Al-Azhar University alumni
Academic staff of Qatar University
Academic staff of Hamad Bin Khalifa University
Qatari women in politics
Members of the Consultative Assembly of Qatar
Year of birth missing (living people)